Hussein Ali Akil (born 3 May 1990) is a footballer who plays for Australian club St George FC. Born in Australia, Akil played for the Lebanon national under-23 team.

Club career

Early career 
In 2008 Akil debuted for the Bankstown City Lions in the New South Wales Premier League aged 17. On 10 February 2011, it was announced that Akil had signed with the first-team of New South Wales Premier League side Sydney Olympic, having been transferred from Lebanese Premier League side Al-Mabarrah.

Woodlands Wellington
Akil debuted for S.League side Woodlands Wellington in a 1–0 away win against Young Lions on 12 February. One week later, Akil scored his first goal for his club in a 3–1 home win against Geylang United on 19 February. On 23 November 2012, it was announced by Woodlands Wellington that he would not be retained for the 2013 season.

Fraser Park 
In 2013 Akil played for Fraser Park FC. He played two games in 2014, scoring once on 12 April against Hills Brumbies. In the 2015 NPL NSW 2 preseason cup, Akil played four games. He finished as the season top-goalscorer, with 13 goals.

Hakoah Sydney City East and Bankston 
In 2016 Akil joined Hakoah Sydney City East, scoring three goals in 10 games during the 2016 NPL NSW. In 2017 he moved to Bankston City FC, playing 24 games and scoring twice in the 2017 NPL NSW 2.

St George FC 
Akil joined NPL NSW 2 side St George FC in 2018, playing 25 games and scoring 10 in his first season. In 2019, as the club's captain, Akil played 24 games and scored 5. In 2020, he scored one goal in two games.

International career
In 2008 Hussein represented Australia at U-19 Schoolboy level, where he participated in international friendlies in the United Kingdom.

In 2010, Akil was called up to the Lebanon national under-23 team by coach Emile Rustom, for a friendly against Syria on 23 December. Akil was substituted onto the field in the 45th minute for Mohamad Haidar, as Lebanon won the match 2–0.

Career statistics

Club

References

Living people
1990 births
Australian people of Lebanese descent
Sportspeople of Lebanese descent
Lebanese footballers
Australian soccer players
Association football midfielders
Sydney FC players
Bankstown City FC players
Al Mabarra Club players
Sydney Olympic FC players
Woodlands Wellington FC players
Fraser Park FC players
Hakoah Sydney City East FC players
St George FC players
National Premier League players
Lebanese Premier League players
Singapore Premier League players
Lebanon youth international footballers
Lebanese expatriate footballers
Lebanese expatriate sportspeople in Singapore
Australian expatriate soccer players
Australian expatriate sportspeople in Singapore
Expatriate footballers in Singapore